Elizabeth M. Cousens is the current President and CEO of the United Nations Foundation.

Life 
Cousens received her B.A. in history from the University of Puget Sound and a D.Phil. in International Relations from the University of Oxford, where she was a Rhodes Scholar. 

She worked for several years at the U.S. Mission to the UN in New York. She was Principal Policy Advisor and Counselor to the Permanent Representative of the United States to the United Nations, and later served as the U.S. Ambassador to the UN Economic and Social Council and Alternate Representative to the UN General Assembly where she led U.S. negotiations on the SDGs; served on the boards of UN agencies, funds, and programmes; and was U.S. representative to the UN Peacebuilding Commission.

Works

Elizabeth M. Cousens (2018). Extremely loud and uncomfortably close: Lessons of the “Great War” 100 years on. Brookings Institution.
Elizabeth Cousens (2018). 'Why I Won't Apologize for Using the Word "Multilateralism'. United Nations Foundation

References

http://usun.state.gov/leadership/c52008.htm

United Nations Foundation
American Rhodes Scholars
Year of birth missing (living people)
Living people